Hippodamia americana, the American lady beetle, is a species of lady beetle in the family Coccinellidae. It is found in North America.

Subspecies
These two subspecies belong to the species Hippodamia americana:
 Hippodamia americana americana
 Hippodamia americana fontinalis Casey

References

Further reading

 

Coccinellidae
Articles created by Qbugbot
Beetles described in 1873